Secure Islands Technologies Ltd. was an Israeli privately held technology company headquartered in Beit Dagan which was subsequently acquired by Microsoft. The company develops and markets Information Protection and Control (IPC) solutions.

Secure Islands Technologies Ltd. was founded by two brothers, Aki and Yuval Eldar, in late 2006, to develop and sell advanced data security solutions. The then Jerusalem-based start-up company suggested a new solution for data protection: embedding security directly in data. Secure Islands builds software designed to classify sensitive information automatically based on policies outlined by an enterprise, and then to wrap it in the appropriate level of Digital rights management (DRM).

About Secure Islands Technologies Ltd.
Microsoft acquired Israeli cyber-sec startup Secure Islands in 2015.

Technology
Secure Islands Technologies Ltd. software is based on its active data immunization concept. Secure Islands’ Data Immunization technology uniquely embeds protection within information itself at the moment of creation or initial organizational access. This process is automatic and accompanies sensitive information throughout its lifecycle from creation, through usage and collaboration to storage and archival.

The company's IQProtector product, which is cloud-based, classifies unstructured data and automates IRM by classification at endpoints.

See also
 Data loss prevention software
 Active Directory Rights Management Services

References

Software companies of Israel
Web service providers